The 2002 Shelkovskaya Mil Mi-8 crash in Chechnya killed 14 people, including senior Russian officers, among them the deputy Interior Minister Mikhail Rudchenko.

On January 27, 2002, a Russian Interior Ministry Mil Mi-8 was shot down and exploded near Shelkovskaya in Nadterechny District, killing 14 people including crew. Among those killed in the crash were Lieutenant-General Mikhail Rudchenko responsible for security in the Southern Federal District, and Major-General Nikolai Goridov, deputy commander of the Internal Troops, as well as Colonels Oriyenko, Stepanenko, and Trafimov.

References

External links
Helicopter Crash Kills Senior Officials 

2002 disasters in Russia
Aviation accidents and incidents in 2002
Helicopter crashes of the Second Chechen War
Accidents and incidents involving the Mil Mi-8
January 2002 events in Russia
2002 in Chechnya
Aviation accidents and incidents in Russia